David C. Fajgenbaum (born March 29, 1985) is an American immunologist and author who is currently an assistant professor at the Perelman School of Medicine of the University of Pennsylvania. He is most well known for his research into Castleman disease.

Early life and education 

David C. Fajgenbaum was born and grew up in Raleigh, North Carolina, on March 29, 1985, to a physician father and stay at home mother. Fajgenbaum played football at Ravenscroft School and aspired to play college football growing up.

He was recruited to Georgetown University to play football. Soon after arriving at college, his mother was diagnosed with glioblastoma. She died in October 2004. Fajgenbaum started Actively Moving Forward in memory of his mother to support other grieving college students at Georgetown. In 2005, Fajgenbaum co-founded Actively Moving Forward to support students on college campuses across the nation.

He received a B.S. from Georgetown University and graduated Omicron Delta Kappa in 2007, M.Sc. from the University of Oxford, M.D. from the Perelman School of Medicine of the University of Pennsylvania, and M.B.A. from the Wharton School of the University of Pennsylvania. He volunteered as executive director of Actively Moving Forward Support Network during college and graduate school. While in graduate school, he married his wife Caitlin; the couple has two children.

While in medical school, Fajgenbaum became critically ill with idiopathic multicentric Castleman disease. Following his third relapse in 2012, Fajgenbaum co-founded the Castleman Disease Collaborative Network and began conducting research into idiopathic multicentric Castleman disease.

Research 

In 2015, Fajgenbaum joined the Perelman School of Medicine of the University of Pennsylvania as an assistant professor of medicine and associate director of the Orphan Disease Center, where he remains today. Fajgenbaum is the founding director of the Center for Cytokine Storm Treatment & Laboratory, which is focused on unlocking the unknowns of hyperinflammatory diseases and identifying novel treatments for these deadly conditions.

Fajgenbaum has been a pioneer in the field of Castleman disease, most widely known for the identification of a new treatment approach. In 2014, he discovered increased mTOR signaling in idiopathic multicentric Castleman disease and began testing an mTOR inhibitor on himself to assess its efficiency. Fajgenbaum co-authored a review article on Cytokine Storm in the New England Journal of Medicine.

In 2020, Fajgenbaum launched the CORONA Project to identify and advance the most promising treatments for COVID-19.

In 2022, Fajgenbaum co-founded the nonprofit organization, Every Cure, whose mission is to unlock the full potential of approved medicines to treat every disease possible. Fajgenbaum announced the launch of Every Cure at the Clinton Global Initiative.

Books 

In 2015, Fajgenbaum co-authored and wrote his first book, We Get It: Voices of Grieving College Students and Young Adults. A unique collection of 33 narratives by bereaved students and young adults, We Get It aims to help young adults who are grieving and provide guidance for those who seek to support them.

In September 2019, Fajgenbaum's second book, Chasing My Cure: A Doctor's Race to Turn Hope Into Action, was published. Chasing My Cure is a memoir describing Fajgenbaum's work to spearhead the search for a cure for his disease. According to the Penguin Random House website, Chasing My Cure is a Los Angeles Times and Publisher's Weekly Bestseller

Select awards and honors 

 2006 Good Works Team Selection, American Football Coaches Association
 2007 BRICK Award, Do Something Organization
 2007 Joseph L. Allbritton Fellowship, Oxford University, Georgetown University President's Office.
 2007 First-team Academic All-American, USA Today
 2008 21st Century Gamble Scholarship, University of Pennsylvania Perelman School of Medicine
 2008 Make it Matter Story of the Month Reader's Digest
 2012 Welcome Back Award: Community Service, Eli Lilly & National Council for Community Behavioral Healthcare
 2013 Distinguished Service Award, University of Colorado
 2015 30 Under 30 List, Healthcare, Forbes Magazine
 2015 RARE Champion of Hope – Science, Global Genes
 2016 Young Friends Atlas Award, World Affairs Council of Philadelphia
 2016 Fellow, College of Physicians of Philadelphia
 2016 RareVoice Award: Federal Advocacy – Patient Advocate, EveryLife Foundation & Rare Disease Legislative Advocates
 2017 100 Great Healthcare Leaders to Know, Becker's Hospital Review
 2018 Young Investigators Draft Awardee, Uplifting Athletes
 2020 Joseph Wharton Award, Wharton Club of DC
 2022 Janet Davison Rowley Patient Impact Research Award, Cures Within Reach
 2022 Service to Science Award, National Disease Research Interchange
 2022 40 Under 40, Philadelphia Business Journal

References

External links 

 Castleman Disease Collaborative Network
 Every Cure
 NY Times - His Doctors Were Stumped. Then He Took Over.
 The Today Show - Doctor with rare disease racing to save his own life
 Good Morning America - 1 doctor's remarkable journey to cure his rare disease
 Forbes Magazine 30 Under 30 Healthcare List
 NPR's Fresh Air - Doctor With Rare Disease And No Answers Decides To Find His Own Cure
 USA TODAY - New uses for old drugs? Every Cure offers hope for people with rare diseases
 CNN - This med student was given his last rites before finding a treatment that saved his life. His method could help millions.
 NPR - 5 lessons one doctor learned from the times he almost died
 5 Things to Know About Dr. David Fajgenbaum
 ABC - New nonprofit aims to identify unrelated generic drugs to help cure rare diseases

1985 births
Living people
American immunologists
Georgetown Hoyas football players
Scientists from North Carolina
People from Raleigh, North Carolina
Perelman School of Medicine at the University of Pennsylvania alumni
Alumni of the University of Oxford
American expatriates in the United Kingdom
Perelman School of Medicine at the University of Pennsylvania faculty